Pöttyös utca (lit. Spotted street) is a station on the M3 (North-South) Line of the Budapest Metro. Next to the station, there is a huge socialist housing estate (microraion), which named after Attila József. The station was opened on 20 April 1980 as part of the extension from Nagyvárad tér to Kőbánya-Kispest.

References 
Budapest City Atlas, Dimap-Szarvas, Budapest, 2011, 

M3 (Budapest Metro) stations
Railway stations opened in 1980